Merton Field is a grass playing field north of the main part of Christ Church Meadow and south of Merton College in central Oxford, England.

To the west are Merton Walk and Christ Church, one of the Oxford colleges. To the east is the University of Oxford Botanic Garden. To the south is Broad Walk a wide path on the northern edge of Christ Church Meadow. To the north, Dead Man's Walk skirts the edge of Merton Field following the line of the old city wall and Grove Walk leads to Merton Street, between Corpus Christi College and Merton College. The tower of Merton College Chapel dominates the view north from Merton Field.

Near to the eastern end of Dead Man's Walk is a plaque marking the first hot air balloon ascent in Britain, made by James Sadler (1753–1828). He ascended from Merton Field on 4 October 1783, landing in Woodeaton to the northeast of Oxford.

Gallery

References

Parks and open spaces in Oxford
Christ Church Meadow, Oxford
Merton College, Oxford
Sports venues in Oxford
Sport at the University of Oxford
Ballooning